The presence of Ghanaians in Italy dates back to the 1980s.

Numbers
In 2010 in Italy there are 46,890 regular immigrants from Ghana. In 2006 there were 36,540. The three cities with most number of Ghanaians are: Palermo, Modena and Reggio Emilia.

History

In Italy the migration from Ghana began in the mid-1980s, when people came over as students driven by economic motives.

The choice of Italy as a place of destination, it is often due to the ease of obtaining an entry visa, and the difficulty of obtaining an entry permit for other European countries. In fact initially the preferred destinations are Britain, then Netherlands and the United States, but many of them, the first citation is available and has been for Italy.
Towards the year 1988 also was easier to get a visa for Italy because there were few immigrants, but Britain was more rigid because many Ghanaians actually entered as tourists stayed permanently.
The guys of the second generation who were born in Italy, studying, trying to carve out a space, to achieve a respectable economic independence and parents work very hard to guarantee them a relative stability.

Entrepreneurship
Ghanacoop was born in Modena in 2005 within the National Association of Ghana and it is one of the first non-profit social enterprises run by immigrants on the Italian territory. It's a concrete example of community enterprise, involving an entire community as a whole of its economic activities, social or cultural.
The farm, which involves 135 workers cultivating an area of 400 hectares, exports its products to the British market and, through Ghanacoop, on the Italian market. On the local market the product is sold to both distributors of fresh produce, and for firms engaged in processing for the production of juices, fruit concentrates and fruit cut, or, in the Italian business vocabulary, fourth range.

Notable Ghanaians in Italy

Gloria Hooper, (1992) athlete
Fred Kudjo Kuwornu (1971) Filmmaker, Producer
Bello FiGo, (1992) YouTuber, singer
Mario Balotelli, (1990) footballer
Giovanni Kyeremateng, (1991) footballer
Desmond N'Ze, (1989) footballer
Kelvin Yeboah, Footballer 
Kingsley Boateng, (1994) footballer

References

African diaspora in Italy
History of Ghana
Ethnic groups in Italy